Belt wrestling was contested as a demonstration sport at the 2009 Asian Indoor Games in Hanoi, Vietnam from 5 November to 6 November 2009. The competition took place at Sóc Sơn Gymnasium.

Medalists

Men's freestyle

Men's classic style

Women's freestyle

Medal table

Results

Men's freestyle

66 kg
5 November

73 kg
5 November

81 kg
5 November

90 kg
5 November

100 kg
5 November

+100 kg
5 November

Men's classic style

66 kg
6 November

73 kg
6 November

81 kg
6 November

90 kg
6 November

100 kg
6 November

+100 kg
6 November

Women's freestyle

58 kg
5 November

66 kg
5 November

References

External links
 Official site

2009 Asian Indoor Games events
Asian Indoor Games
2009
Wrestling in Vietnam